is a railway station located in Tayoro-chō (多寄町), Shibetsu City, Kamikawa-shichō, Hokkaidō, and is operated by the Hokkaido Railway Company.

Lines serviced
JR Hokkaidō
Sōya Main Line

Adjacent stations

External links
Ekikara Time Table - JR Mizuho Station (Japanese)

Railway stations in Hokkaido Prefecture
Railway stations in Japan opened in 1987